Natasha Badhwar is an Indian author, columnist, filmmaker, journalist and a media trainer. She has written the books, My Daughters Mum and Immortal For a Moment.

Biography
Natasha Badhwar was born on 11 July 1971 in Ranchi.

Badhwar began her career in broadcast journalism with NDTV (New Delhi Television Ltd.). She worked with NDTV for almost 13 years and left it as vice president for training and development in 2007.

She covered the 2002 Gujarat riots as a video journalist.

Selected works
Books by Badhwar include:
 My Daughters Mum
 Immortal for a Moment: Small Answers to Big Questions About Life, Love and Letting Go
 Reconciliation: Karwan-e-Mohabbat's Journey of Solidarity through a Wounded India (co-authored with Harsh Mander and John Dayal).

References

1971 births
Living people
Indian journalists
Indian writers
People from Ranchi
NDTV Group
Jamia Millia Islamia alumni